Jason Cahill is an American television writer and producer, who is best known for his work on the acclaimed HBO series The Sopranos and on the FOX science fiction series Fringe.

Career 
Jason Cahill began his writing career on the short-lived CTV series Two in 1996 and then moved to NBC where he contributed scripts for ER and Profiler, where he also worked as an executive story editor. He has also worked on series such as NYPD Blue and Surface.

Work on The Sopranos 
Cahill served as executive story editor on 5 episodes of the first season of The Sopranos. He wrote 3 episodes of the show:

 "Meadowlands" (1.04)
 "Boca" (1.09) (with Robin Green & Mitchell Burgess)
 "Guy Walks Into a Psychiatrist's Office..." (2.01)

Work on Fringe 
 "Power Hungry" (1.05) (with co-written by co-executive producer Julia Cho)
 "Safe" (1.10) (co-written by co-executive producer David H. Goodman)

Filmography

References

External links 

Living people
Year of birth missing (living people)
Place of birth missing (living people)
20th-century male writers
21st-century American male writers
American television writers
American male screenwriters
American male television writers
21st-century American screenwriters